The Washington District is a Norfolk Southern Railway line in the U.S. state of Virginia that connects Alexandria and Lynchburg. Most of the line was built from 1850 to 1860 by the Orange and Alexandria Railroad, while a small portion in the center opened in 1880 as the Charlottesville and Rapidan Railroad. Today, the line is mainly used for freight service, but Amtrak's Crescent, Cardinal and Northeast Regional passenger services use all or part of the line, and the Virginia Railway Express Manassas Line commuter service uses the northernmost portion of the line.

Route 
The line begins at the CR Tower signal, where lines from the NS Van Dorn Yard meet with the Horn Track, connecting to the CSX RF&P Subdivison in Alexandria, where it splits from the CSX Transportation RF&P Subdivision.  It connects to the B-Line in Manassas at the Powell Signal. At Orange, the Buckingham Branch Railroad's Washington Subdivision splits and forms a loop that rejoins the Washington District at Charlottesville.  It crosses the CSX James River Subdivision, and then ends at Lynchburg, becoming the NS Danville District.  

The line crosses the Rappahannock, Rapidan, South Fork Rivanna, Tye, and James Rivers. The Rivermont Tunnel is next to the James River crossing.

History 

The line was originally constructed by the Orange and Alexandria Railroad.  The portion north of Orange was constructed from 1850 to 1854.  The extension south to Lynchburg was completed in 1860, with a short section in between that was part of the Virginia Central Railroad.

After the Civil War, the company came under the control of the Baltimore and Ohio Railroad. By 1881, several mergers had made it part of the Virginia Midland Railway, which in 1886 was leased to the Richmond and Danville Railroad. Both were merged into the Southern Railway in 1894, forming part of its main line.

The Southern Railway later acquired the Charlottesville and Rapidan Railroad, which had opened in 1880, bypassing the former Virginia Central Railroad segment (which is now the Buckingham Branch Railroad's Washington Subdivision).  The Southern Railway merged into Norfolk Southern in 1982.

Service 
The line is part of Norfolk Southern's Piedmont Division. It is mainly used for freight service.  Major customers include a Cargill grain elevator in Culpeper. A former customer, the  Pepco Generating Facility, closed in 2012. Other customers include Robinson Terminal in Springfield Virginia, Vulcan Rock Facility in Springfield Virginia, Washington Gas in Springfield Virginia, Virginia Paving Alexandria Virginia, NS Ethanol Transflow Facility, Alexandria Virginia and Vulcan Rock Quarry, Casanova Virginia (Casanova Branch). 

Amtrak uses the line for various trains. Its Crescent uses the entire line as part of its New York City-to-New Orleans service. The Cardinal uses the portion from Alexandria to Orange as part of its New York-to-Chicago service. Since 2009, its Northeast Regional service uses the portion of the line to Lynchburg.

The Virginia Railway Express Manassas Line uses the northernmost portion of the line from Alexandria to the Broad Run station just past Manassas.

References

External links 

 Piedmont Division timetables and maps

Norfolk Southern Railway lines
Rail infrastructure in Virginia
Southern Railway (U.S.)